The Pöbelbach is a small river of Saxony, Germany. It flows into the Red Weißeritz in Schmiedeberg.

See also
List of rivers of Saxony

Rivers of Saxony
Rivers of the Ore Mountains
Rivers of Germany